In mathematics, the spin representations are particular projective representations of the orthogonal or special orthogonal groups in arbitrary dimension and signature (i.e., including indefinite orthogonal groups). More precisely, they are two equivalent representations of the spin groups, which are double covers of the special orthogonal groups. They are usually studied over the real or complex numbers, but they can be defined over other fields.

Elements of a spin representation are called spinors. They play an important role in the physical description of fermions such as the electron.

The spin representations may be constructed in several ways, but typically the construction involves (perhaps only implicitly) the choice of a maximal isotropic subspace in the vector representation of the group. Over the real numbers, this usually requires using a complexification of the vector representation. For this reason, it is convenient to define the spin representations over the complex numbers first, and derive real representations by introducing real structures.

The properties of the spin representations depend, in a subtle way, on the dimension and signature of the orthogonal group. In particular, spin representations often admit invariant bilinear forms, which can be used to embed the spin groups into classical Lie groups. In low dimensions, these embeddings are surjective and determine special isomorphisms between the spin groups and more familiar Lie groups; this elucidates the properties of spinors in these dimensions.

Set-up

Let  be a finite-dimensional real or complex vector space with a nondegenerate quadratic form . The (real or complex) linear maps preserving  form the orthogonal group . The identity component of the group is called the special orthogonal group . (For  real with an indefinite quadratic form, this terminology is not standard: the special orthogonal group is usually defined to be a subgroup with two components in this case.) Up to group isomorphism,  has a unique connected double cover, the spin group . There is thus a group homomorphism  whose kernel has two elements denoted , where  is the identity element.

Concretely, we may assume  and

Concretely, we may assume  and

Complex spin representations

Let  with the standard quadratic form  so that 

Isotropic subspaces and root systems

A standard construction of the spin representations of  begins with a choice of a pair 
Let us make such a choice.

Then there is a unique basis  of  such that

The root spaces (simultaneous eigenspaces for the action of ) are spanned by the following elements:
 with root (simultaneous eigenvalue) 
 (which is in  if  with root 
 with root 
 with root 
 with root 
Thus, with respect to the basis , the roots are the vectors in  that are permutations of

together with the permutations of

if  is odd.

The corresponding simple roots are

The positive roots are nonnegative integer linear combinations of the simple roots.

Spin representations and their weights

One construction of the spin representations of  uses the exterior algebra(s)
 and/or 

The Lie algebra  is isomorphic to the complexified Lie algebra  in  via the mapping induced by the covering 

They are actually equivalent representations, so we focus on S.

and each weight space is one-dimensional.

The weights divide into those with an even number of minus signs, and those with an odd number of minus signs. Both S+ and S− are irreducible representations of dimension 2m−1 whose elements are called Weyl spinors. They are also known as chiral spin representations or half-spin representations. With respect to the positive root system above, the highest weights of S+ and S− are
 and 
respectively. The Clifford action identifies ClnC with End(S) and the even subalgebra is identified with the endomorphisms preserving S+ and S−. The other Clifford module S′ is isomorphic to S in this case.

When n is odd, S is an irreducible representation of so(n,C) of dimension 2m: the Clifford action of a unit vector u ∈ U is given by 

and so elements of so(n,C) of the form u∧w or u∧w∗ do not preserve the even and odd parts of the exterior algebra of W. The highest weight of S is

The Clifford action is not faithful on S: ClnC can be identified with End(S) ⊕ End(S′), where u acts with the opposite sign on S′. More precisely, the two representations are related by the parity involution α of ClnC (also known as the principal automorphism), which is the identity on the even subalgebra, and minus the identity on the odd part of ClnC. In other words, there is a linear isomorphism from S to S′, which identifies the action of A in ClnC on S with the action of α(A) on S′.

Bilinear forms

if λ is a weight of S, so is −λ. It follows that S is isomorphic to the dual representation S∗.

When n = 2m + 1 is odd, the isomorphism B: S → S∗ is unique up to scale by Schur's lemma, since S is irreducible, and it defines a nondegenerate invariant bilinear form β on S via

Here invariance means that
 
for all ξ in so(n,C) and φ, ψ in S — in other words the action of ξ is skew with respect to β. In fact, more is true: S∗ is a representation of the opposite Clifford algebra, and therefore, since ClnC only has two nontrivial simple modules S and S′, related by the parity involution α, there is an antiautomorphism τ of ClnC such that
 
for any A in ClnC. In fact τ is reversion (the antiautomorphism induced by the identity on V) for m even, and conjugation (the antiautomorphism induced by minus the identity on V) for m odd. These two antiautomorphisms are related by parity involution α, which is the automorphism induced by minus the identity on V. Both satisfy τ(ξ) = −ξ for ξ in so(n,C).

When n = 2m, the situation depends more sensitively upon the parity of m. For m even, a weight λ has an even number of minus signs if and only if −λ does; it follows that there are separate isomorphisms B±: S± → S±∗ of each half-spin representation with its dual, each determined uniquely up to scale. These may be combined into an isomorphism B: S → S∗. For m odd, λ is a weight of S+ if and only if −λ is a weight of S−; thus there is an isomorphism from S+ to S−∗, again unique up to scale, and its transpose provides an isomorphism from S− to S+∗. These may again be combined into an isomorphism B: S → S∗.

For both m even and m odd, the freedom in the choice of B may be restricted to an overall scale by insisting that the bilinear form β corresponding to B satisfies (1), where τ is a fixed antiautomorphism (either reversion or conjugation).

Symmetry and the tensor square

The symmetry properties of β: S ⊗ S → C can be determined using Clifford algebras or representation theory. In fact much more can be said: the tensor square S ⊗ S must decompose into a direct sum of k-forms on V for various k, because its weights are all elements in h∗ whose components belong to {−1,0,1}. Now equivariant linear maps S ⊗ S → ∧kV∗ correspond bijectively to invariant maps ∧kV ⊗ S ⊗ S → C and nonzero such maps can be constructed via the inclusion of ∧kV into the Clifford algebra. Furthermore, if β(φ,ψ) = ε β(ψ,φ) and τ has sign εk on ∧kV then

for A in ∧kV.

If n = 2m+1 is odd then it follows from Schur's Lemma that

(both sides have dimension 22m and the representations on the right are inequivalent). Because the symmetries are governed by an involution τ that is either conjugation or reversion, the symmetry of the ∧2jV∗ component alternates with j. Elementary combinatorics gives

and the sign determines which representations occur in S2S and which occur in ∧2S. In particular
 and

for v ∈ V (which is isomorphic to ∧2mV), confirming that τ is reversion for m even, and conjugation for m odd.

If n = 2m is even, then the analysis is more involved, but the result is a more refined decomposition: S2S±, ∧2S± and S+ ⊗ S− can each be decomposed as a direct sum of k-forms (where for k = m there is a further decomposition into selfdual and antiselfdual m-forms).

The main outcome is a realisation of so(n,C) as a subalgebra of a classical Lie algebra on S, depending upon n modulo 8, according to the following table:

For n ≤ 6, these embeddings are isomorphisms (onto sl rather than gl for n = 6):

Real representations

The complex spin representations  of so(n,C) yield real representations S of so(p,q) by restricting the action to the real subalgebras. However, there are additional "reality" structures that are invariant under the action of the real Lie algebras. These come in three types.
 There is an invariant complex antilinear map r: S → S with r2 = idS. The fixed point set of r is then a real vector subspace SR of S with SR ⊗ C = S. This is called a real structure.
 There is an invariant complex antilinear map j: S → S with j2 = −idS. It follows that the triple i, j and k:=ij make S into a quaternionic vector space SH. This is called a quaternionic structure.
 There is an invariant complex antilinear map b: S → S∗ that is invertible. This defines a pseudohermitian bilinear form on S and is called a hermitian structure.

The type of structure invariant under so(p,q) depends only on the signature p − q modulo 8, and is given by the following table.

Here R, C and H denote real, hermitian and quaternionic structures respectively, and R + R and H + H indicate that the half-spin representations both admit real or quaternionic structures respectively.

Description and tables
To complete the description of real representation, we must describe how these structures interact with the invariant bilinear forms. Since n = p + q ≅ p − q mod 2, there are two cases: the dimension and signature are both even, and the dimension and signature are both odd.

The odd case is simpler, there is only one complex spin representation S, and hermitian structures do not occur. Apart from the trivial case n = 1, S is always even-dimensional, say dim S = 2N. The real forms of so(2N,C) are so(K,L) with K + L = 2N and so∗(N,H), while the real forms of sp(2N,C) are sp(2N,R) and sp(K,L) with  K + L = N. The presence of a Clifford action of V on S forces K = L in both cases unless pq = 0, in which case KL=0, which is denoted simply so(2N) or sp(N). Hence the odd spin representations may be summarized in the following table.

The even-dimensional case is similar. For , the complex half-spin representations are even-dimensional. The resulting even spin representations are summarized as follows.

(*) For , we have instead 

The low-dimensional isomorphisms in the complex case have the following real forms.

The only special isomorphisms of real Lie algebras missing from this table are
 and

Notes

References
 .
 .
 .
 . See also the programme website for a preliminary version.
 .
 .
 .
 .

Spinors
Representation theory of Lie groups